"Over-the-air" is a synonym for "over a wireless network".

Over-the-air can also refer to

Electronics and technology
 Over-the-air programming, secure distribution of software, configuration settings, or encryption keys to electronic devices via an insecure connection
 Terrestrial television, broadcast of television using radio waves from an earth-based transmitter
 Radio broadcasting, transmission of audio by radio waves intended to reach a wide audience

Events
 Over the Air, a mobile-focused hack day and developer conference series in London

See also
 OTA bitmap, also known as Over The Air Bitmap, a proprietary specification for black and white images for mobile phones
 Ota (disambiguation)